is a railway station on the Seibu Ikebukuro Line in Nerima, Tokyo, Japan, operated by the private railway operator Seibu Railway.

Lines

Station layout

The station consists of two elevated island platforms serving four tracks.

Platforms

History

The station was elevated on February 7, 2010 (platforms 3&4), April 17, 2011 (platform 2), and June 23, 2012 (platform 1).

Station numbering was introduced on all Seibu Railway lines during fiscal 2012, with Shakujii-kōen Station becoming "SI10".

Passenger statistics
In fiscal 2013, the station was the 11th busiest on the Seibu network with an average of 74,212 passengers daily.

The passenger figures for previous years are as shown below.

Surrounding area

The roads around the station's south entrance are quite narrow and efforts have been made to encourage use of the north entrance, a larger, more open area where bus stops, parking, an Isetan supermarket, and bicycle racks are located. However, the south entrance, closer to residential areas, traditional shopping streets, and Shakujii Park (after which the station is named), continues to see greater use, the area around it being quite congested around rush hour times. On March 23, 2013 an additional west entrance was constructed opposite the original north and south entrances which have been collectively termed the "central entrance". Plans to expand this station plaza area have been included in upcoming track-laying construction projects.

An extensive commercial and housing area called "Eminade Shakujii-kōen" is expected to be completed by fiscal year 2015. Opening in three stages, the first stage of this project was opened on October 2, 2013, as "Emio Shakujii-kōen" at a cost of ¥900 million. Located largely towards the west exit and in close proximity to the station complex, it saw the opening of nineteen stores including a café, a general store, and the supermarket Ito Yokado. The second stage of the project, "Emio Shakujii-kōen East" is expected to be completed on August 21, 2014. This stage will see the opening of six stores comprising two fashion establishments (Muji and Buona Vita), an opticians and three catering establishments. Sections of the second stage comprising a daycare center, a pharmacist and a pet-care center were opened prior to the main section over the course of 2014.

Two bus terminals are located within Shakujii-kōen Station: "Shakujii-kōen Station North Entrance" and "Shakujii-kōen Station South Entrance". The terminals are served by: Seibu Bus, Airport Limousine, Kantō Bus and Kokusai Kōgyō Bus.

The bus services available from Shakujii-kōen Station as of August 2014 are displayed in the table below.

References

External links

 Shakujii-kōen Station information (Seibu Railway) 

Seibu Ikebukuro Line
Stations of Seibu Railway
Railway stations in Japan opened in 1915
Railway stations in Tokyo